Metacyrba floridana (Dwarf Florida Jumping Spider) is a species of spider in the family Salticidae, the jumping spiders. It is native to the United States and has been reported from the following states: Arizona, Florida, Georgia, Louisiana, Mississippi, and Texas.

References

Salticidae
Spiders described in 1934